Clark Mountain may refer to:

 Clark Mountain (California), a peak in California, USA
 Clark Mountain (Maine), a peak in Androscoggin County, Maine, USA
 Clark Mountain (Washington), a peak in the Cascade Range, Washington, USA